This is a list of full-block structures in New York City:

Manhattan
 111 Eighth Avenue, full-block Art Deco multi-use building located between Eighth and Ninth Avenues, and 15th and 16th Streets in the Chelsea neighborhood of the Manhattan borough of New York City
 2 Columbus Circle 
 3 Columbus Circle
 5 Manhattan West
 731 Lexington Avenue, 1,400,000 square foot glass skyscraper on the East Side of Midtown Manhattan, New York City
 Alexander Hamilton U.S. Custom House, built in 1902–07 by the federal government to house the duty collection operations for the Port of New York
 American Museum of Natural History, one of the largest museums in the world. The museum complex comprises 27 interconnected buildings housing 45 permanent exhibition halls, in addition to a planetarium and a library
 The Apthorp
 The Belnord
 Charles M. Schwab House
 Flatiron Building, triangular 22-story steel-framed landmarked building located at 175 Fifth Avenue in the borough of Manhattan, New York City
 General Theological Seminary, seminary of the Episcopal Church located between West 20th and 21st Streets and Ninth and Tenth Avenues in the Chelsea neighborhood of Manhattan
 James A. Farley Building, formerly the General Post Office Building
 Madison Square Garden
 Manhattan House
 Museum of Arts and Design
 New York Life Building
 Pennsylvania Station (1910–1963)
 St. Patrick's Cathedral (Manhattan)
 Starrett-Lehigh Building
 Trump International Hotel and Tower (New York City)
 Tunnel (New York nightclub)
 United Palace
 Waldorf Astoria New York

The Bronx
 Bronx Borough Courthouse
 Bronx County Courthouse
 Bronx County Hall of Justice
 Bronx-Lebanon Hospital Center
 Evander Childs Educational Campus
 Kingsbridge Armory
 Lincoln Hospital
 Theodore Roosevelt High School (New York City)
 United States Post Office–Bronx Central Annex
 Yankee Stadium
 Yankee Stadium (1923)

Full-block structures in New York City

Full-block structures
Full-block apartment buildings in New York City
Architecture in New York City